Theta Nu Xi Multicultural Sorority, Inc. is a historically multicultural sorority founded on April 11, 1997, at the University of North Carolina at Chapel Hill (UNC), by seven women who sought to bridge cultural gaps. Theta Nu Xi was incorporated on April 29, 1999.

History
Theta Nu Xi was founded during a time when cultural Greek organizations began to proliferate on campuses across the United States. Theta Nu Xi was the first multicultural sorority founded in the Southeastern United States. The sorority has since grown to more than sixty chapters and colonies in over twenty years of existence.

In the spring of 1996, Melissa Jo Murchison-Blake sought a sisterhood that openly embraced all women and crossed cultural boundaries. As a bi-racial woman, she did not want to choose between historically Caucasian or African-American sororities. Murchison-Blake felt that if she did choose one, she would be denying half of her heritage.

Murchison-Blake recruited six other women who would become the national founders of Theta Nu Xi Multicultural Sorority. The founders were Geeta Nadia Kapur, Natalie Nicole Barker, Peggy Virginia Long, Melissa Jo Murchison-Blake, Brenda Imade Eribo, Katherine Ellen Stanley, and Janelle Kalia Poe

In the early days of its existence, the sorority met resistance from its campus of founding. The Director of Greek Affairs at the University of North Carolina at Chapel Hill advised the national founders to consider joining an existing organization, expressing his concern that a new Greek organization based on the principle of multiculturalism, would not survive at UNC. Despite such resistance, the national founders' continued efforts set the stage for Theta Nu Xi's presence in the Greek, non-Greek, and surrounding communities.

The University of North Carolina at Chapel Hill officially recognized Theta Nu Xi Multicultural Sorority as the Alpha chapter on April 11, 1997. To commemorate the result of their perseverance, the national founders–now known as the Founding Monarchs–acknowledged April 11, 1997, as the official founding date of the organization. With the collaborative efforts of the Founding Monarchs and the initiates of spring 1998, the organization grew exponentially.

The earliest members of Theta Nu Xi addressed an immediate need to develop an official process of expansion that would support new entities as well as serving the interests of the sorority. Under the visionary guidance of Anna Lamadrid, new chapters were founded in the spring of 1999 at North Carolina State University and one at UNC Greensboro. The three groups of women designated themselves Alpha, Beta, and Gamma, respectively, and thus the national organization was born.

The Sorority was incorporated on April 29, 1999, and with the participation of the Alpha chapter, the Beta colony, and the Gamma colony, the national organization was established at the first annual National Convention on August 21, 1999. The first out-of-state expansion effort resulted in the founding of the Utah State University chapter in the spring of 2000.

Graduate, Alumnae, and Professional (GAP) Program
In the first national constitution, the earliest members of Theta Nu Xi laid the foundation for an active post-graduate status. On July 19, 2000, sixteen women petitioned the national board to be granted status as an Alumnae chapter. These women requested that a structure be put in place that would allow post-collegiate members the ability to participate fully in Sorority activities and the national organization while a more complete structure was being developed. The national board granted the sixteen pioneers the equivalent of chapter status, allowing them to send representatives to the 2000 National Convention.

At this convention, on behalf of the Alumnae chapter, Soror Jerri Kallam submitted a resolution to establish Alumnae Chapter Standards. During the same meeting, Soror Amanda Greene, representing the Alpha chapter, submitted a resolution to create a committee to examine the role of alumnae and professional membership. These resolutions were adopted and a committee was created. This committee, composed of Sorors Jerri Kallam, Christie Aden, Shannon Stewart, and Melissa Murchison-Blake, was charged with refining and further developing the name, structure, and important documents relating to alumnae and professional membership and so sparked the development of an official Graduate, Alumnae, and Professional (GAP) Program.

At the 2001 National Convention, the alumnae committee submitted a GAP policy along with supporting documents. Through the advocacy of this committee and the success of the program as evidenced by the GAP-initiated women present at the Convention, the GAP program was officially established and became the first of its kind for multicultural sororities. Founding Monarchs Melissa Murchison-Blake and Janelle Poe, along with Sorors Holly Woodard and Rebecca Treherne, officially chartered the first GAP chapter on April 11, 2002.

Being the first multicultural sorority to offer an established Graduate, Alumnae, and Professional Program, Theta Nu Xi Multicultural Sorority, Inc. began receiving numerous inquiries from interested women.  As more women were initiated at this level, and as undergraduate members graduated, the GAP program became a crucial component of the Sorority's structure.

GAP women now serve on the National Board, support the undergraduate sisterhood as advisors, and participate in all aspects of Sorority operations including expansion teams, national committees, ONEVision - the official Sorority newsletter, and more.

Values
The mission of Theta Nu Xi Multicultural Sorority, Inc. is to promote leadership, multiculturalism, and self-improvement through academic excellence, involvement in and service to the campus and community, as well as being living examples of sisterhood across different races, cultures, religions, backgrounds, and lifestyles.

The tenets of the Sorority are Scholarship, Service, Sisterhood, Leadership, and Multiculturalism. The motto of the Sorority is "Sisters of Diversity, Together as ONE". The objectives of the sorority are to incorporate separate cultures into one life, to build self-esteem through sisterhood, to participate in service activities, especially those concerning diversity in the community, to encourage academic excellence and overall self-improvement, and to promote unity among Greek organizations.

Structure

Regions
Theta Nu Xi is structured into five regions.

 Undergraduate chapters 
Following are the undergraduate chapters of Theta Nu Xi; the active chapters are indicated in bold and the inactive chapters are indicated in italic.

 Notes 

 Graduate, alumnae, and professional chapters 
These are the non-collegiate chapters of Theta Nu Xi. Active chapters are indicated in bold; inactive chapters are indicated in italic''.

Notes

References

Student societies in the United States
Fraternities and sororities in the United States
Student organizations established in 1997
Ethnic organizations based in the United States
Women's rights organizations
Anti-racist organizations in the United States
Multiculturalism in the United States
National Multicultural Greek Council
1997 establishments in North Carolina